Kambikatoto is an administrative ward in the Chunya district of the Mbeya Region of Tanzania. In 2016 the Tanzania National Bureau of Statistics report there were 7,815 people in the ward, from 7,091 in 2012.

Villages / vitongoji 
The ward has 2 villages and 7 vitongoji.

 Kambikatoto
 Gengeni
 Iwolelo
 Kibaoni
 Laini
 Sipa
 Majiweni
 Mawonde
 Mwamasesa

References 

Wards of Mbeya Region